Chetanya Adib is an Indian actor, voice actor, model and singer who speaks English and Hindi. He is best known for playing Khazaan Singh in the Hindi soap-opera show, Balika Vadhu on Colors TV.

Filmography

Film

Television

Dubbing roles

Live action television series

Animated series

Live action films

Indian films

Foreign language films

Animated films

See also
Dubbing (filmmaking)
List of Indian dubbing artists

References

External links

1971 births
Living people
Male actors from Mumbai
Indian male voice actors
Male actors in Hindi cinema
Indian male models
Indian male singers